The Battle of Bologna was fought in Bologna, Italy from 9–21 April 1945 during the Second World War, as part of the Spring 1945 offensive in Italy. The Allied forces were victorious, with the Polish II Corps and supporting Allied units capturing the city on 21 April.

Background

In March 1945 the Allies were preparing a new offensive, Operation Buckland, in Northern Italy. The capture of Bologna, an important regional communication hub, was set as a part of that offensive. The Allied forces tasked with this were composed of the US 5th Army (II Corps, South African 6th Armoured Division) and the British 8th Army (which for that part of the theatre, was composed of the V Corps and the Polish II Corps). The German units defending the area were composed of the German 26th Panzer Division of the XIV Panzer Corps, the 1st Parachute Division and the 4th Parachute Division of the I Parachute Corps. German defenses in that region were part of the Army Group C, defending the Paula Line.

The morale of the Polish forces was weakened by the outcome of the Yalta Conference which ended on 11 February, where the British and Americans, without consultation with the Poles, had decided to give a major part of the 1921–1939 Polish territories to the Soviet Union. One of the three Polish divisions, the Polish 5th Kresowa Infantry Division, was named after the Kresy region, which was now given to the Soviets in its entirety. When the Polish commander of II Corps, General Władysław Anders, asked for his unit to be withdrawn from the front line, Winston Churchill told him "you [the Poles] are no longer needed" but the American and British front line commanders—Generals Richard McCreery, Mark Wayne Clark and Field Marshal Harold Alexander—requested Anders that the Polish units remain in their positions, as they had no troops to replace them. Anders eventually decided to keep the Polish units engaged.

Order of battle

Allies

US 5th Army
II Corps
South African 6th Armoured Division
United States Army Air Forces
62d Fighter Wing
Brazilian 1st Fighter Squadron
British 8th Army
V Corps
Polish II Corps

Major-General Zygmunt Bohusz-Szyszko (acting commander)
 Corps Troops
 Army Group Polish Artillery
 54th Super Heavy Regiment Royal Artillery (one battery)
 British 7th Armoured Brigade (under command)
 43rd Gurkha Lorried Infantry Brigade (under command)
 14th/20th Hussars (Kangaroo armoured personnel carriers) (under command)
 Polish 3rd Carpathian Rifle Division (Major-General Bolesław Bronisław Duch)
 1st Carpathian Rifle Brigade
 2nd Carpathian Rifle Brigade
 3rd Carpathian Rifle Brigade
 Polish 5th Kresowa Infantry Division (Major-General Nikodem Sulik)
 5th Wilenska Infantry Brigade
 6th Lwowska Infantry Brigade
 4th Wolwyn Infantry Brigade
 Polish 2nd Armoured Brigade (Brigadier-General Bronislaw Rakowski)

Germans
XIV Panzer Corps
German 26th Panzer Division
German 65th Infantry Division
I Parachute Corps (Richard Heidrich commanding)
1st Parachute Division
4th Parachute Division

Battle
The offensive on Bologna started on 9 April at 4:00 am local time, with a major air and artillery bombardment of 400 guns firing on German positions, followed by an advance of ground forces the same evening. Friendly fire caused casualties as American bombers killed 38 advancing Polish troops on that day. The American and British units engaged the German flanks, while the Polish units broke through to the city. On 10 April, Polish forces pushed the Germans away from the Senio River. From 12 to 14 April Polish forces fought the Germans at the Santerno River and captured Imola. From 15 to 16 April, the Poles fought at the Sillaro River and the Medicina Canal. On 17 April, the commander of the Eighth Army ordered the Polish forces to continue their push towards Bologna from the east. The town was to be taken initially by the American troops of the Fifth Army advancing from the south.

On 21  Carpathian Rifle Brigade of the Polish 3rd Carpathian Infantry Division entered the city, where only isolated German units were still fighting. (Another source attributes the entrance to the Polish 5th Kresowa Division). By 6:15 am the Poles had secured the city, displaying Polish flags from the town hall and the Torre Asinelli tower, the highest tower in the city. The local Italian population welcomed the Poles as their liberators. At 8:00 am, American (South African) tanks arrived in the city, followed by Italian partisans and the "Friuli" division of the Italian Co-belligerent Army.

Aftermath
The Battle of Bologna was the last battle of the Polish II Corps, which was taken out of the front line on 22 April. American and British troops completed their encirclement of the Germans forces north of the Reno River, the 8th Indian Division crossed the Po River and the German forces in Italy capitulated on 29 April. The Polish II Corps, commanded by General Zygmunt Bohusz-Szyszko, suffered 234 dead and 1,228 wounded out of 55,780 front line personnel.

German divisions were left in disarray, and as the end of the war neared, many splintered into small groups in order to retreat across the Po and try to reach the passes into Germany. The 65th Infantry Division lost its commander, Generalmajor Hellmuth Pfeifer in the last days of the war as he tried to make his way north with the remnants of divisional headquarters.

Notes

References
  Zbigniew Wawer, Zdobycie Bolonii [Capture of Bologna], Chwała Oręża Polskiego 32 (53), Rzeczpospolita, 3 March 2007 (publication contains a map of the battle).

1945 in Italy
1945 in military history
20th century in Bologna
April 1945 events
Bologna
Battles of World War II involving Brazil
Bologna